Nathalie  Ivanovna  Kovanko (Ukrainian: Наталія Іванівна Кованько, Russian:  Наталья Ивановна Кованько; 13 September 1899 – 23 May 1967) was a Russian Empire-born film actress of the silent era. Born Natalia Ivanovna Kovanko in Crimea, then part of the Russian Empire, in 1919 she emigrated to France following the Russian Revolution. She married Viktor Tourjansky, a fellow exile. She later returned to live in USSR, where she died in 1967.

Selected filmography
  (1925)
 Michel Strogoff (1926)
 Volga in Flames (1934)

References

Bibliography
 Michelangelo Capua. Anatole Litvak: The Life and Films. McFarland, 2015.

External links

1899 births
1967 deaths
Ukrainian people in the Russian Empire
Ukrainian film actresses
Ukrainian silent film actresses
Russian film actresses
French film actresses
People from Yalta
Actors from Kyiv
People who emigrated to escape Bolshevism
Soviet emigrants to France
20th-century French women